Albrighton is a surname. Notable people with the surname include:

Marc Albrighton (born 1989), English footballer
Mark Albrighton (born 1976), English footballer